Alexander Caldwell Jones was an American lawyer, journalist, diplomat, and Confederate States Army officer during the American Civil War.

Early life
He was born in 1830 near Moundsville, West Virginia, at that time a part of Virginia, to Garrison B. Jones and Martha Houston.  He enrolled at Virginia Military Institute on July 28, 1846, and was graduated on July 4, 1850.

He then studied law and moved to Minnesota territory, where he became a district attorney and served as probate judge in St. Paul, Minnesota. In 1858-1860 he served as Minnesota's adjutant general.

Civil War
When his native state declared its secession from the United States in 1861 he returned to Virginia, where he joined the 44th Virginia Infantry. He was commissioned a lieutenant-colonel on May 1, 1862, and was wounded in the Battle of Gaines's Mill.

After convalescing from his injuries and serving in the Bureau of Conscription he resigned his commission on June 16, 1863, and requested a transfer to the Trans-Mississippi Dept. There he served on Gen. Magruder's staff and was then given the command of a Texas brigade of infantry. Gen. Kirby Smith recommended his promotion to brigadier-general on March 16, 1865, although there is no confirmation of his appointment. Jones was paroled in Brownsville, Texas on July 24, 1865, as a "brigadier-general". He was given a presidential pardon, dated August 15, 1865, sponsored by the Attorney General and the Hon. J. J. Jackson, which described him as a "rebel brigadier general".

Later life
Jones left for Mexico to serve under Emperor Maximilian until the fall of his regime. He then returned to West Virginia, and lived in Wheeling with his wife Ella Clemens' family. He became the editor of the National Intelligencer, but that newspaper failed in 1869.

In 1880 he was appointed U.S. Consul in Nagasaki and was transferred in 1886 to the China embassy in Chungking, where he died on Jan. 13, 1898.

References

1830 births
1898 deaths
People from Moundsville, West Virginia
Virginia Military Institute alumni
People of West Virginia in the American Civil War
Military personnel from Minnesota
American diplomats
Confederate States Army officers
Military personnel from West Virginia
People from Wheeling, West Virginia
Editors of West Virginia newspapers